Columba McVeigh (1958 – 1 November 1975) was a youth from Northern Ireland who was abducted and probably murdered by the Provisional Irish Republican Army (IRA). He was listed as one of the "Disappeared" by the Independent Commission for the Location of Victims' Remains.

Disappearance
A seventeen-year-old from Donaghmore, County Tyrone, McVeigh disappeared in November 1975. The IRA say he had confessed to being a British Army intelligence agent who had received orders to infiltrate the IRA's ranks, but have never indicated what specific act prompted McVeigh's murder. Unsuccessful searches were carried out for the location of his body in 2003, 2011 and 2012. In September 2018 forensic archaeologists started searching Braggan Bog, near Emyvale. That search ended without success in September 2019, having paused between November 2018 and June 2019. Senior investigator Joe Hill said, "If Columba had been here we would have found him."

See also
 Independent Commission for the Location of Victims' Remains
 List of people who disappeared
 Jean McConville
 Peter Wilson (Disappeared)
 Gerard Evans
 Charlie Armstrong

Notes

External links
 The Disappeared of Northern Ireland: Columba McVeigh
 Exhumed body isn’t that of teenage IRA victim The journal.ie, 12 August 2011

1958 births
1970s missing person cases
1975 deaths
1975 murders in the United Kingdom
Deaths by firearm in Northern Ireland
Enforced disappearances in Northern Ireland
Kidnapped people from Northern Ireland
Missing children from Northern Ireland
Murder victims from Northern Ireland
Missing person cases in Ireland
Missing person cases in the United Kingdom
People declared dead in absentia
People from County Tyrone
People killed by the Provisional Irish Republican Army
People murdered in Northern Ireland
Terrorism deaths in Ireland